The women's 49erFX competition of the sailing events at the 2015 Pan American Games in Toronto was held from July 12 to July 18 at the Royal Canadian Yacht Club.

Points were assigned based on the finishing position in each race (1 for first, 2 for second, etc.). The points were totaled from the top 15 results of the first 16 races, with lower totals being better. If a team was disqualified or did not complete the race, 7 points were assigned for that race (as there were 6 teams in this competition). The top 5 teams at that point competed in the final race, with placings counting double for final score. The team with the lowest total score won.

Schedule
All times are Eastern Daylight Time (UTC-4).

Results
Race M is the medal race.

References

External links
Sailing schedule

Sailing at the 2015 Pan American Games
49er FX competitions